South Florida is a recognized region of the state of Florida, comprising Palm Beach, Broward, Miami-Dade, and Monroe Counties. These counties contain approximately 12% of the land in Florida, but 28% of its population. The University of South Florida, in Tampa, is not in South Florida as the term is used today.

The history of the Jews in South Florida dates back to the 19th century. Many South Florida Jews are Ashkenazi (descendants of Russian, Polish, and Eastern European ancestry), and Latin American (Cuba, Brazil, Venezuela, Colombia, Mexico, Argentina, Chile). Many are also French, Moroccan, Syrian, Bukharian, and Israeli. There is a significant Sephardic and Mizrachi population as well.

Presently, there are approximately 514,000 Jews living in South Florida.

The population of Palm Beach County is 15.8% Jewish. Boca Raton, with a population of about 95,000, has 16 synagogues.

Key West, Florida Jewish history

The exact origins of the Key West Jewish Community are not dated, but Jews were first recorded in the city in the 1880s, when the community was organized by Joe Wolfson, Abraham Wolkowsky and Mendell Rippa. It is believed that most settlers were escaping European persecution at the time. Some early settlers were shipwrecked and decided to make a living in the city. In 1887, Congregation B'nai Zion was founded in Key West, Fl. Morris Zion served as its first president. B'nai Zion's building was built in 1969, and it adheres to Conservative Judaism, though it has a Liberal slant. In 1895, Jewish Key West residents supported the independence of Cuba from Spain.

West Palm Beach, Florida Jewish history

Jews first settled in the city of West Palm Beach in 1892.

Miami, Florida Jewish history

Jews first permanently settled in the Miami, Florida area in 1896. In 1907, the first bris occurred in Miami-Dade County. It was for Eddie Cohen. In 1913, B'nai Zion, the first congregation in Miami-Dade County, was founded. It later was renamed as Beth David. In 1953, Abe Aronovitz became the first and only Jewish mayor of Miami.

Broward County, Florida Jewish History

In 1910, Louis Brown was the first Jew to settle in Broward County.

Miami Beach, Florida Jewish History

The first Jewish family to settle in Miami Beach was the Weiss family, Joseph and Jennie and their children, in 1913.  They later opened Joe's Stone Crab Restaurant.  The first congregation in Miami Beach was Beth Jacob, which was formed in 1927.  The congregation built the first synagogue in 1929 (now the Jewish Museum of Florida.) In 1943, the first of 16 Jewish mayors of Miami Beach, Mitchell Wolfson, was elected to office.

Other history

In 1959, approximately 10,000 Cuban Jews sought refuge in South Florida.
In 1995, the Jewish Museum of Florida opened.
In 2004, Debbie Wasserman Schultz of Weston, Florida became the first Jewish woman from Florida to be elected to the U.S. Congress.
In 2012, Scott Israel was elected Sheriff of Broward County, making him the first Jew to be elected Sheriff in Florida history.

Jewish religious observance in South Florida 

There are nearly 189 synagogues and congregations built to serve over 500,000 Jews in South Florida.

Orthodox Judaism

There are approximately 77 Orthodox synagogues and congregations in South Florida.

Conservative Judaism

There are approximately 60 Conservative synagogues and congregations in South Florida.   Notable synagogues include The Cuban Hebrew Congregation.

Reform Judaism

There are approximately 40 Reform synagogues and congregations in South Florida.

Reconstructionist Judaism

There are three established Reconstructionist synagogues and congregations in South Florida: Congregation Kol Ami (Palm Beach County), Ramat Shalom (Broward County), and Temple Beth Or (Miami-Dade County).

Chabad in southern Florida
Chabad and its affiliated Adult Educational organization The Rohr Jewish Learning Institute are active in Florida.

Chabad of Palm Beach Gardens
Chabad of Palm Beach Gardens aims to bring together the Jewish Community of the greater Palm Beach and Jupiter area and to serve the spiritual, educational and social needs of the community.

Chabad of Boca Raton

Chabad of Boca Raton is a Chabad house located in Boca Raton founded in 1989, the present building was erected in 1999. In 1990 city officials permitted it to erect a menorah in Sanborn Square, a city park.

Significant South Floridian communities and their Jewish populations 
Fort Lauderdale Metropolitan Area, Florida: approximately 234,000 Jews live in all of Broward County.
Fort Lauderdale, Florida: 24,377 Jews live in Fort Lauderdale.
Pembroke Pines, Florida: approximately 19,988 Jews live in Pembroke Pines.
Weston, Florida: approximately 18,000 Jews live in Weston.
Plantation, Florida approximately 11,275 Jews live in Plantation.
Davie, Florida approximately 11,228 Jews live in Davie.
South Palm Beach Metropolitan Area, Florida: approximately 134,200 Jews live in South Palm Beach County as of 2018.
West Palm Beach Metropolitan Area, Florida: approximately 94,000 Jews live in West Palm Beach (Palm Beach County from Boynton Beach to Jupiter).
Miami Metropolitan Area, Florida: approximately 123,000 Jews live in Miami-Dade County, an increase from 113,000 in 2004.
Miami Beach, Florida: Approximately 15,000 Jews live in Miami Beach.
Aventura, Florida
Fort Myers, Florida
Key West, Florida

Prominent South Floridian Jews 
Col. Abraham C. Myers
Former Florida Governor David Sholtz
Former Miami Mayor Abe Aronovitz
Representative Debbie Wasserman Schultz
Representative Ted Deutch
Representative Lois Frankel
Secretary of Agriculture Nikki Fried
Former Attorney General of the State of Florida and Third District Court of Appeals Judge Robert L. Shevin, as well as other members of the Shevin family, in law and business.
Founder of Wometco Theatres and former Miami Beach mayor Mitchell Wolfson
Former Miami Beach mayor and 2018 gubernatorial candidate Philip Levine
The Applerouth family originally of Key West, and Miami, Florida.
Television journalist Chuck Todd
Federal Maritime Commissioner Lou Sola
Banker and former owner of City National Bank of Florida, Leonard L. Abess
Avraham Lapciuc a scholar who attended Rutgers Business and Philanthropist
Actor and comedian Eric Andre
Conservative political commentator Ben Shapiro

See also

Jewish Americans
Jewish American Heritage Month

References

External links
A History of The Jews of South Florida  Rabbi Menachem Levine, Aish.com
Jewish Museum of Florida
Jewish South Florida
Jewish Miami
Florida Jewish History
Jewish in Miami
Jewish Federation of Broward County
Greater Miami Jewish Federation
Jewish Federation of Palm Beach County

South Florida
Jews and Judaism in Broward County, Florida
History South
Jews and Judaism in Miami-Dade County, Florida
History